Bałdy  is a village in the administrative district of Gmina Purda, within Olsztyn County, Warmian-Masurian Voivodeship, in northern Poland.

The village has a population of 100.

Before 1772 the area was part of Kingdom of Poland, 1772–1871 Prussia, 1871–1945 Germany, and again Poland since 1945.

In the early modern period, until the Partitions of Poland, ceremonies of welcoming newly appointed bishops of Warmia took place in Bałdy. Referring to this tradition, there is the Bishops' Alley (Aleja Biskupów) in the village with memorial stones dedicated to all historical bishops of Warmia.

References

Villages in Olsztyn County